Vulcan is a town in southern Alberta, Canada that is surrounded by Vulcan County. It is on Highway 23, midway between the cities of Calgary and Lethbridge. The population of the town was 1,917 in 2016. Now known as the "Official Star Trek Capital of Canada", Vulcan has a tourism building made to look like a landed space station, a statue of the original series Enterprise, and other Star Trek themed attractions.

History 

Vulcan was named by a surveyor for the Canadian Pacific Railway after the Roman God of Fire – Vulcan. Originally, all the streets of Vulcan were named after gods and goddesses of the classical world such as Juno, Mars, and Jupiter.

The community was incorporated as a village on December 23, 1912, and then as a town on June 15, 1921. In July 1927, a major tornado destroyed many homes and the new curling rink in the town. That tornado was made famous when a photograph of it approaching Vulcan was used for the "tornado" article in Encyclopædia Britannica.

The first newspaper to serve the area was the Vulcan Review, which began in 1912 and was published for one year. The Vulcan Review was followed by the Vulcan Advocate in 1913, which is still being published today as member of Sun Media Community Newspapers part of Postmedia Network.

Vulcan once had nine grain elevators, more than any other location west of Winnipeg, making it the largest grain shipping point at that time. Due to the changing economics of the agricultural industry, the original elevators were taken down one by one. Today, Vulcan has only one of the "prairie skyscrapers" left that once could be seen miles away. Although not original, this last wooden elevator was built in the 1980s.

Many of the old hangars still exist and the runways can still be seen. It is now operated as Vulcan/Kirkcaldy Aerodrome and some of the old runways are still in use. There is a second airport, Vulcan Airport.

In 2015 the town council voted to form Heritage Advisory Board Committee to manage the historical sites in Vulcan County.

Demographics 

In the 2016 Census of Population conducted by Statistics Canada, the Town of Vulcan recorded a population of 1,917 living in 829 of its 879 total private dwellings, a  change from its 2011 population of 1,836.

Economy 
The town's economy is mainly tourism and agriculture-based. Wheat, canola and barley are the main crops grown in the Vulcan area.

Oil and gas is another industry that employs many residents of Vulcan

Tourism 

Since 1990, Vulcan has hosted the annual Vulcan Tinman Triathlon, which takes place at the beginning of June. This sprint-distance triathlon attracts nearly 1,000 participants. There are classes for adults of all ages and skill levels as well as for teams and children.

The town's name has brought some attention that has helped it become a tourist attraction. In the Star Trek television and feature film series it is the name of the homeworld of  Mr. Spock and his fellow Vulcans. Capitalizing on this coincidence, the town has built a Star Trek–themed tourist station (the Tourism and Trek Station), which provides tourist information, displays Star Trek memorabilia, provides unique photo opportunities, and allows visitors to participate in The Vulcan Space Adventure virtual reality game. Nearby, a replica of the starship Enterprise from Star Trek V has been mounted on a pedestal which includes writing from Star Trek alien languages such as Klingon.

The town has also created space-themed murals and signs, and hosts an annual community-wide Star Trek convention known as "Spock Days". This convention attracts hundreds of Star Trek fans from around the world.

Infrastructure

Healthcare

Vulcan Community Healthcare Centre
The Vulcan Community Healthcare Centre offers emergency and long-term care medical services. The hospital had 5,125 visits for emergency medical services in the 2013/2014 year.  It has eight medical beds with 15 long-term care beds and hosts a medical clinic.

Geography

Climate 
Vulcan experiences a dry continental climate (Köppen climate classification Dfb) with long, cold winters and short, warm summers.

See also 
List of communities in Alberta
List of towns in Alberta

References

External links 

Digitized issues of the Vulcan Review and Vulcan Advocate newspapers from 1912 - 1967 in the Internet Archive.

1912 establishments in Alberta
Towns in Alberta
Vulcan County